Jaylen Smith (born August 1, 1997) is an American football wide receiver for the Orlando Guardians of the XFL. He played college football at Louisville.

Professional career

Baltimore Ravens
Smith was not selected in the 2019 NFL Draft and was picked up as an undrafted free agent by the Baltimore Ravens. He was waived during final roster cuts on August 30, 2019.

Seattle Seahawks
On December 31, 2019, Smith was signed to the Seattle Seahawks practice squad. His practice squad contract with the team expired on January 20, 2020.

In October 2019, Smith was selected by the DC Defenders in the open phase of the 2020 XFL Draft.

Toronto Argonauts
Smith signed with the Toronto Argonauts of the CFL on June 18, 2021. On July 27, 2021, Smith was cut by the Argonauts.

New England Patriots
On January 10, 2022, Smith was signed to the New England Patriots practice squad.

St. Louis BattleHawks 
On November 17, 2022, Smith was drafted by the St. Louis BattleHawks of the XFL. He was placed on the Reserve List after signing with the Seahawks Practice Squad, but was activated off the list shortly after being released.

Seattle Seahawks
On December 15, 2022, Smith was signed to the Seattle Seahawks' practice squad, but was released two days later.

Orlando Guardians
Smith was claimed off waivers by the Orlando Guardians of the XFL on March 1, 2023, after being released by the BattleHawks.

References

External links
Jaylen Smith on 247 Sports
Louisville Cardinals bio

1997 births
Living people
American football wide receivers
Baltimore Ravens players
Louisville Cardinals football players
People from Pascagoula, Mississippi
Players of American football from Mississippi
Seattle Seahawks players
Toronto Argonauts players
New England Patriots players
St. Louis BattleHawks players
Orlando Guardians players